"Open Your Heart" is a song recorded by American singer-songwriter Madonna for her third studio album True Blue (1986). Written by Gardner Cole and Peter Rafelson, it was conceived as a rock and roll song titled "Follow Your Heart" for singer Cyndi Lauper, but Cole and Rafaelson never had the chance to play it for her. At the time, Cole's management was working with Madonna's, who were looking for material for her third studio album. After her manager asked Cole to present a female demo of the song, Madonna accepted it and, alongside producer Patrick Leonard, turned it into a dance song. Lyrically, it's an innuendo-laden love song where the singer expresses her sexual desire. In the United States, the song was released as the fourth single from True Blue on November 12, 1986; overseas, it was released on December 1. Furthermore, it was included in the compilation albums The Immaculate Collection (1990) and Celebration (2009).

Upon release, the song was well received by music critics; in retrospective reviews, it is now considered to be among Madonna's best singles. "Open Your Heart" was also commercially successful, as it reached the top-ten of the charts in Canada, Belgium, Ireland, Netherlands, and the United Kingdom. It also became Madonna's fifth number one single in the US Billboard Hot 100; she became the second female artist – behind Whitney Houston – to score three number ones from one album. The song's accompanying music video, directed by Jean-Baptiste Mondino, depicts Madonna as an exotic dancer at a peep show who befriends a little boy. It was seen as a tribute to some stars of the Golden Age of Hollywood, such as Marlene Dietrich and Liza Minnelli; critical reception towards the clip was generally positive: the singer was praised for presenting women as the dominant sex, but the plot of a child entering a sex club received criticism. "Open Your Heart" has been performed on three of Madonna's concert tours: Who's That Girl (1987), Blond Ambition (1990) and MDNA (2012). It has also been covered by different artists, including Britney Spears in the 2002 film Crossroads.

Background and release 

According to journalist Fred Bronson, "Open Your Heart" was originally written as a rock and roll song titled "Follow Your Heart", by Gardner Cole and Peter Rafelson for singer Cyndi Lauper, although they never got the chance to play it for her. According to Cole, The Temptations were briefly considered for the song, as well. The original title was taken from a health food restaurant called Follow Your Heart, where Cole met and fell in love with a waitress named Lisa, who became the inspiration for the lyrics. He further explained in Bronson's The Billboard Book of Number 1 Hits:
Peter and I usually write very quickly. It's usually a day or two a song, but for some reason this didn't really hit us as a hit song. We didn't give up on it. We just kept working on it over the course of a year. Thank God we did. [...] It was the first song that was cut on the True Blue album. It made me nervous as a writer, because a lot of times the very first song that gets cut doesn't make it in the long run. But the song ended up making the album, which really opened up a lot of doors for me.
Bennett Freed, Cole's Manager, was working with Madonna's management, who were looking for material for her third studio album; three of Cole's songs were chosen for reviewing, among them "Follow Your Heart". Freddy DeMann, Madonna's manager, overheard the song and thought it would be a hit for the singer and requested Cole recorded a demo of the song told through a female perspective. Cole asked his then-girlfriend Donna De Lory to sing the demo; De Lory eventually would go on to work with Madonna. Despite not fitting with the genre of songs Madonna was singing at that time, she accepted it; afterwards, she rewrote it, produced it, and change its title to "Open Your Heart". Along with producer Patrick Leonard, she added a bassline underneath the song, transforming it into a dance track. "Open Your Heart" was the first song recorded for True Blue in late 1985, and ultimately included on the album's final track list. In the United States, it was released as the album's fourth single on November 12, 1986; In Europe, the release date was December 1. Afterwards, it was included on Madonna's compilation albums The Immaculate Collection (1990), and Celebration (2009).

Composition 

Rikky Rooksby, author of The Complete Guide to the Music of Madonna, noted that "Open Your Heart" has a "continuous" percussion filled structure, and a chorus comparable to the work of Belinda Carlisle. The main concept of the song places Madonna as a victim of love. Lyrically, it's been described as a "simple love song"; for Mavis Tsai, one of the authors of A Guide to Functional Analytic Psychotherapy, its lyrics work as a metaphor for being vulnerable while involved in an intimate or close relationship. The staff of Billboard noted the lyrics are "brimming with sexual innuendo, [Madonna] yearns for a man to open her lock with his key. And yes, that means exactly what you think it does". The line "If you gave me half a chance you'd see, my desire burning inside of me" put the singer, according to author Santiago Fouz-Hernández, in a more direct position of expressing her sexual desires for a man.

According to the sheet music published by Alfred Publishing Inc., "Open Your Heart" is written in the time signature of common time, with a medium funk tempo of 112 beats per minute; the music was published in the key of F major, with Madonna's vocals spanning from A3 to C5. It follows a basic sequence of F–E9–E/G–Gm7–F as its chord progression.

Critical reception 

Upon release, "Open Your Heart" was met with generally positive reviews from music critics. On his biography of the singer, J. Randy Taraborrelli deemed it one off her most "earnest" songs, and compared it to Aretha Franklin's "Respect" (1967), and Barbra Streisand's "A House is Not a Home" (1971); Taraborrelli further added that it was a song people could "understand and latch on to, [which is] what makes a pop song memorable". Author Susan McClary, in Culture/power/history, applauded it for being more upbeat than previous single "Live to Tell", and singled out the track's "play with closure [which] creates the image of open ended jouissance – an erotic energy that continually escapes containment". AllMusic's Stephen Thomas Erlewine cited it as one of the highlights from True Blue; from the same portal, Stewart Mason said it proved the singer hadn't lost her ability to create a "powerful dance song [...] with its newfound rock and roll power (electric guitars join the synthesizers in the front line of instruments, a rarity in Madonna's music to that point), ['Open Your Heart'] was one of [her] most exciting grooves yet". Robert Christgau expressed that "the generosity she demands in the inexhaustible 'Open Your Heart' is a two-way street and then some".

Slants Sal Cinquemani deemed it "robust", and considered it one of Madonna's "biggest, most influential hits". Erika Wexler from Spin named it an "appealing 'I'm going to get you'" song, and praised the production, which she felt "effectively creates the expansive feel of something magically opening". More critical was Peoples Drew Mackie, who said that, despite its "unforgettable" chorus, it's a "minor hit compared to the other major hits of [Madonna's] early career". One negative review came from Robert Hilburn, for the Los Angeles Times: he dismissed "Open Your Heart" as "uneventful", and one of True Blues "flat spots".

Retrospectives reviews have also been positive: for Parade, Samuel R. Murrian named it Madonna's 12th best song, as well as an "essential" cut in her discography. Gay Star News Joe Morgan also considered it one of the singer's "classics", and her 37th best song. For the HuffPosts Matthew Jacobs, it's Madonna's 25th best track. "Open Your Heart" was referred to as a "quintessential clipped-beat Eighties dance-pop jam" by the staff of Rolling Stone, who also named it the singer's 16th best. For Entertainment Weeklys Chuck Arnold, it's her 13th best single; "as much as [Madonna] may be known for her more titillating songs, she has also been capable of pure pop bliss. That can be heard on 'Open Your Heart' [...] she has rarely sounded more open-hearted than she does here", Arnold wrote. For Jude Rogers from The Guardian, and Yahoo!'s Nicole Hogsett, "Open Your Heart" is Madonna's 11th greatest song; the former deemed it one of her "sparkliest imperial-period" singles, while the latter pointed out that "from the opening notes you know that this song is going to be enjoyable". Joel lynch from Billboard wrote: "Few can sing about desire deferred and sound so damn exuberant while doing it, but Madonna provides a masterclass in how it’s done on the defiant 'Open Your Heart'". He placed it on the seventh position of the magazine's ranking of the singer's best songs. It came in the same position in Slants ranking; Ed Gonzalez considered it an "unabashedly sincere and playfully metaphoric" love song. For Stereogum, Tom Breihan deemed it "one of the best singles in a career full of great ones".

Chart performance 

"Open Your Heart" debuted on the Billboard Hot 100 at number 51, the highest-debuting single of the week of December 6, 1986. It was Madonna's tenth consecutive single that debuted as the week's highest. On January 17, 1987, when the single climbed to number seven, Madonna achieved her eleventh consecutive top ten single, breaking a record held by Brenda Lee for the most consecutive top ten hits by a female singer in the rock era; she also tied Michael Jackson and Lionel Richie for the most consecutive top ten hits by any artist in the 1980s. One week later, "Open Your Heart" reached the chart's fourth spot and Madonna surpassed Donna Summer as the female artist in the rock era with the longest string of consecutive top five hits. It reached the top of the Hot 100 on February 7, 1987, becoming Madonna's fifth number-one US single. With this feat, she broke many records: she became the second female singer, behind Whitney Houston, to score three number-one singles from one album, the second behind Barbra Streisand to land a number-one hit in
four successive years, and the second behind Diana Ross with five number-ones strictly as a solo artist. Furthermore, Madonna broke the record of being the only female singer – and one of only four acts – with five number ones in the decade. "Open Your Heart" also saw success on other Billboard charts: it reached number one of the Hot Dance Club Songs on February 14, and became Madonna's sixth Adult Contemporary entry, peaking at number 12 on the chart. 75,000 copies of the 12" single had been sold by July 1987. "Open Your Heart" came in at number 30 on Billboard year-end chart for 1986.

In Canada, the song debuted at number 83 on the RPM chart on December 13, 1986, and peaked at number eight on February 21. In the United Kingdom, "Open Your Heart" debuted at number 8 on the Singles Chart on December 13, 1986, and subsequently peaked at number 4 on December 28; it spent a total of nine weeks on the chart. It was certified silver by the British Phonographic Industry (BPI) in December 1986 for shipment of 250,000 copies. According to MTV UK, over 195,000 copies of the single have been sold in the United Kingdom as of 2010. It was a top ten hit in Belgium, the Netherlands, Italy, Iceland, and Ireland. Furthermore, "Open Your Heart" became the only single from True Blue that did not top the Eurochart Hot 100, coming in at four. In Australia, it reached number 16, breaking a run of nine consecutive top ten singles that Madonna had in the country. In Switzerland, Austria, Germany and France, it reached within the top 40 of the charts.

Music video

Background and synopsis 

The music video for "Open Your Heart" was directed by Jean-Baptiste Mondino, and shot at Echo Park in Los Angeles, during the summer of 1986; David Naylor was in charge of production. Music & Media magazine had initially reported that Madonna's then husband Sean Penn would direct it. The clip takes influence from Liza Minnelli's "Mein Herr" number in Bob Fosse's Cabaret (1972). In it, Madonna plays an exotic dancer at a peep show who befriends a young boy, played by child actor Felix Howard. The peep show was Mondino's idea since, at that time, "we were into a period where we were experimenting [with] some kind of freedom about the body, about sexuality and stuff". The set, including the frontal part with the ticket booth, was built from scratch; Mondino liked the "fakeness" of it all: "when I saw it [...] I said, 'It's so naïve'. It's kind of badly done [...] but there's something sweet about it". The director also suggested Madonna wear a dark-haired wig, because she was "known as being the blonde with short hair".

The video begins with shots of the peep show's sign, which has the reproduction of a Tamara de Lempicka artwork showing three naked women; the central woman's nipples have been replaced with light bulbs. Felix Howard is trying to get in, but gets rebuffed by an old man at the ticket booth. Inside, Madonna starts singing the song wearing the black wig, which she quickly removes to reveal her cropped platinum blonde hair. She's dressed in a black satin bustier with gold nipple caps and tassels. Regularly, a curtain rises or comes down behind a glass panel, as if the show's audience were putting coins in the slot; the audience in the booths include two Navy officers, a middle-aged man, an overweight man, a young man with dreadlocks, and a short-haired woman implied to be a lesbian. Also present are wooden cut-outs of Tamara de Lempicka paintings. Throughout the video, Madonna dances with a single prop: that of a solitary chair. Towards the end, she comes out of the theater and gives Howard a quick kiss on his lips; they both are now clad in loose-fitting gray suits. The video ends with them strolling away playfully in the sunrise, in a shot that was compared to one of Charlie Chaplin and Jackie Coogan in The Kid. The old man from the ticket booth chases after them shouting, "come back, come back, we still need you" in Italian.

Reception and analysis 

The music video received positive reviews; for the Houston Chronicle, Bruce Westwood named it one of the year's best. The staff of Rolling Stone considered it the singer's third greatest video, as well as her "first overtly risqué clip [...] An even mix of Fellini and Fosse, ['Open Your Heart'] was gorgeous, from the paintings of art deco artist Tamara de Lempicka on the club exterior, to the colorfully cold cast of characters". It was named Madonna's 14th best by Samuel R. Murrian, who also called it "sexy, clever and hilarious". Gay Star News Joe Morgan singled out the Navy officers as a homosexual couple, and praised the video for "making short hair on women sexy". Tom Breihan deemed it a "statement video", and noted the singer paid tribute to some stars of the Golden Age of Hollywood, such as Marlene Dietrich, Rita Hayworth, and Liza Minnelli. Sal Cinquemani, on a Billboard article, deemed it one of Madonna's most "visually striking and sexually provocative" clips. Despite positive reception, "Open Your Heart" caused controversy; some feminist groups accused Madonna of "setting back history", and reproached her for promoting the return of bustiers and corsets. Writer Susan Bardo chastised the "leering and pathetic" men in the cubicles, and referred to the ending sequence, in which the singer and Howard escape together as "cynically and mechanically tacked on [as] a way of claiming trendy status for what is just cheesecake – or, perhaps, pornography". Ilene Rosenzweig called out Madonna for "lasciviously" kissing Howard. On a similar note, Joe Morgan dismissed Howard's "pervy teen" character. The video was banned on some television channels and MTV nearly refused to broadcast it; this was solved when executives from the network met with representatives from Warner Bros., Madonna's label. At the 1987 MTV Video Music Awards, "Open Your Heart" was nominated in three categories: Best Art Direction, Best Choreography, and Best Female Video. In Europe, it was one of 1987's most heavily rotated clips on television.

The clip also received praise for presenting women as the dominant sex; in  Religion and Popular Culture in America (2005), Bruce Forbes and Jeffrey H. Mahan compared its themes to the ones in Mötley Crüe's "Girls, Girls, Girls" (1987), with the difference that "Open Your Heart" is told from Madonna's point of view; she looks down into the cubicles to make eye contact with the men but they are unable to return it. Forbes also noted an undertone of mockery when Madonna addresses them when singing the word "baby". Author Donn Welton pointed out that the usual power relationship between the "voyeuristic male gaze and object" is destabilized by the portrayal of the male audience members as "leering and pathetic". At the same time, the portrayal of Madonna as "porno queen object" is deconstructed by the escape at the end of the video. Bruce Westwood compared it to the singer's video for "Material Girl" (1985), as in both, she "plays a role within a role"; "[Madonna] gets her audience's attention with skin and flashiness, then assumes a warm, sweet pose at the end as if to say, 'It was all an act. I'm a good-hearted, sensitive person in real life'", Westwood wrote. Sal Cinquemani described it as both a "deconstruction of female empowerment and the male gaze", and "a testament to Madonna’s power as a performer, commanding attention with little more than her body and a wooden chair". "Open Your Heart" was considered the 22nd greatest music video of all time by Slant.

Live performances 

"Open Your Heart" has been included on three of Madonna's concert tours: Who's That Girl (1987), Blond Ambition (1990), and MDNA (2012). On the first one, it was performed as opening number and saw the singer running "back and forth across the stage", with a giant Tamara de Lempicka portrait projected behind her; she was dressed in the same bustier from the music video, and joined by 13-year-old dancer Chris Finch. For The Washington Post, Richard Harrington noted that Madonna's outfit was "a lot less suggestive than some of her body movements". Two different performances can be found on the videos Who's That Girl: Live in Japan, filmed in Tokyo on June, and Ciao Italia: Live from Italy, filmed in Turin on September.
For the song's performance on 1990's Blond Ambition World Tour, the singer wore the corset with conical-shaped cups designed by Jean Paul Gaultier, and did a choreography with a chair while a muscular dancer watched her from afar. Harrington opined it was one of the concert's numbers that "suffered from overly tight choreography that left little to chance, less to spontaneity and nothing to the imagination". Two different performances can be found in Blond Ambition Japan Tour 90, taped in Yokohama, and in Blond Ambition World Tour Live, taped in Nice.

The song's opening introduction was used as a brief interlude on 2001's Drowned World Tour. On the New Jersey and Las Vegas concerts of 2008's Sticky & Sweet Tour, the singer did a capella renditions of "Open Your Heart" per the crowd's request. On February 5, 2012, Madonna sang snippets of the single during the Super Bowl XLVI halftime show, where she was joined by a marching band, and singer Cee Lo Green. For that year's MDNA Tour, "Open Your Heart" was reworked as a "European folk song", relying only on drums and vocal harmonies. It was mashed up with "Sagarra Jo!", a song by Basque band Kalakan, who joined Madonna for the performance. Rocco Ritchie, the singer's son, was also present. On her review of the New York concert, Caryn Ganz from Spin singled out the song's "elegant reworking".  The performances of the song at the November 19–20 shows in Miami were recorded and released in the MDNA World Tour live album (2013).

At the 56th Annual Grammy Awards, on January 26, 2014, Macklemore & Ryan Lewis sang their song "Same Love" (2012) as Queen Latifah acted as the officiant for 33 couples who were getting married right there in the ceremony; then, Madonna emerged dressed in a white Ralph Lauren suit to sing "Open Your Heart". One year later, during the Manchester concert of the singer's Rebel Heart Tour on December 14, she sang the single a capella, a moment that had "everyone singing along" according to the Manchester Evening News Katie Fitzpatrick. On July 27, 2017, Madonna performed "Open Your Heart" at Leonardo DiCaprio's annual fundraising gala, held in Saint-Tropez, France.

Covers and media appearances 

A Spanish version of the song titled "Abre Tu Corazón" was recorded by Venezuelan rock singer Melissa, and included on her 1986 album Melissa III. The 2000 tribute album Virgin Voices: A Tribute To Madonna, Vol. 2 contained a cover by Israeli singer Ofra Haza; one year later, Who's That Girl covered "Open Your Heart" for the album Exposed!. In 2002, French–Dutch group Mad'House did a Eurodance take on the song, that was included on their album Absolutely Mad. A hi-NRG cover by In-Deep was included on Platinum Blonde NRG, Vol. 2: Nrgised Madonna Classics (2004). In the opening sequence of the 2002 film Crossroads, Britney Spears' character Lucy lip syncs to the song in her room holding a spoon for a microphone. Finally, in 2010, Cory Monteith and Lea Michele performed a mashup of "Open Your Heart" and Madonna's 1984 single "Borderline" in the episode "The Power of Madonna" of American television series Glee.

Track listing 

US / JAP 7" single
 "Open Your Heart" – 4:12
 "White Heat" – 4:25

US 12" single
 "Open Your Heart" (Extended Version) – 10:35
 "Open Your Heart" (Dub) – 6:43
 "White Heat" – 4:25

UK 7" single
 "Open Your Heart" (7" Remix) – 3:59
 "Lucky Star" (7" Edit) – 3:44

UK 12" single / UK limited edition 12" picture disc
 "Open Your Heart" (Extended Version) – 10:35
 "Open Your Heart" (Dub) – 6:43
 "Lucky Star" – 5:33

Credits and personnel 
Madonna – lead vocals, background vocals, songwriter
Jonathan Moffett – drums
Paulinho da Costa – percussion
David Williams – guitar
Patrick Leonard – keyboard
 Herb Ritts – photography
 Jeri McManus – art direction
 Kim Champagne - design

Credits adapted from the True Blue album and 12" single liner notes.

Charts

Weekly charts

Year-end charts

Certifications and sales

References

Bibliography 
 
 
 
 
 
 
 
 
 

 
 
 
 
 
 
 

1986 songs
1986 singles
Billboard Hot 100 number-one singles
Cashbox number-one singles
Madonna songs
Music videos directed by Jean-Baptiste Mondino
Songs written by Madonna
Songs written by Gardner Cole
Song recordings produced by Madonna
Song recordings produced by Patrick Leonard
Sire Records singles
Warner Records singles
Music video controversies